The Kalenić Monastery is an important Serbian Orthodox monastery near Rekovac in central Serbia. It was built by protovestiarios Bogdan in the early 15th century (1407-1413). Village of Kalenićki Prnjavor lies nearby. Painter Radoslav came from the monastery of Kalenić.

Kalenić was declared Monument of Culture of Exceptional Importance in 1979, and it is protected by Republic of Serbia.

See also
Monument of Culture of Exceptional Importance
Tourism in Serbia

References

External links

 Serbian unity congress
 Pictures

Religious buildings and structures completed in 1413
15th-century establishments in Serbia
15th-century Serbian Orthodox church buildings
Christian monasteries established in the 15th century
Medieval Serbian Orthodox monasteries
Serbian Orthodox monasteries in Serbia
Šumadija
Cultural Monuments of Exceptional Importance (Serbia)